Beaver Dam is a flooded marble quarry in Cockeysville, Maryland that has been used as a swimming location since the 1930s. Currently, a 30-acre swim club is located there with two swimming pools, a volleyball court, picnic tables and grills, a creek, and snack house. The 40 foot deep freshwater quarry has floating platforms, two rolling logs, diving and jumping platforms, and a rope swing.

The quarry began operation in the 19th century and much of the labor was that of Irish immigrants using hand drills, hammers and chisels. In 1878, Hugh Sisson acquired the property and began using the latest equipment available: steam powered derricks, shovels, and diamond bit drills. Stone was loaded onto wagons and pulled by oxen to the nearby Northern Central Railway in Cockeysville until the quarry site itself was connected to the rail in 1866. The dolomitic marble, known to geologists as the Cockeysville Marble, from the quarry was used widely within the eastern United States, including the Washington Monument in Baltimore and the one in Washington, D.C.

Notes

References

External links 
 Beaver Dam Swimming Club
 Cultural Resources Information

Cockeysville, Maryland
Quarries in the United States